Paadenurme Nature Reserve is a nature reserve which is located in Lääne-Viru County, Estonia.

The protected area was founded in 1992 to protect valuable habitat types and threatened species in Vinni, Alutaguse and Mustvee Parish. In 1997 the protected area was designated to the nature reserve.

References

Nature reserves in Estonia
Geography of Lääne-Viru County